Nikita Konovalov (born 27 July 1988) is a Russian swimmer who has won more than ten medals at the European and world championships since 2009.

Konovalov was addicted to computer games, and because of that around 2006 he was skipping school and training sessions for many months. He has a tattoo covering his chest and arms, which is dedicated to Illidan Stormrage, a character in the Warcraft series of video games.

References

1988 births
Living people
Russian male freestyle swimmers
Russian male swimmers
Male butterfly swimmers
Sportspeople from Omsk
European Aquatics Championships medalists in swimming
World Aquatics Championships medalists in swimming